The Centre for Defence and International Security Studies (or CDiSS) is a British defence and security think tank. CDiSS is engaged in research, analysis, commentary and discussion on issues of significance within the broad context of international security.

The Centre has no allegiances, but serves as a conduit between the academic community, government and other official and unofficial bodies, and the defence and security industries.  The Centre organises conferences and seminars, undertakes focused and directed research and publishes papers in hard and soft copy.  Its members also contribute to journals.  Membership of CDiSS includes those with a background in academia, industry, the armed forces, non-governmental organisations, government and the media.

The current director of CDiSS is Martin Edmonds BA, MA (Econ), PhD, FRSA

History 
The Centre for Defence and International Security Studies, established in 1990 at Lancaster University, by merger of two previous institutions: the Centre for Defence and Security Analysis and the Centre for the Study of Arms Control and International Security.

In 2004 it became an independent institution. It has been recognised as a non-governmental organisation by the United Nations.

Activities 

There are currently 8 research programmes running within CDISS. Each programme addresses a topic of contemporary relevance in the international defence and security debate.

 Space Security 
 Royal Navy and the Carrier Programme 
 Missile Threats & Responses  
 European Security & Transatlantic Relations 
 Military Professionalism and Integrity 
 Nuclear Weapons and Strategy Programme 
 Maritime and Aviation Security - The Ark Royal Programme

See also 
 List of UK think tanks

References

External links
 

Foreign policy and strategy think tanks based in the United Kingdom
International security
Think tanks established in 1990
Military-related organizations